Lewis Gibson may refer to:

 H. Lou Gibson (1906–1992), British-American medical photographer
Lewis Gibson (figure skater) (born 1994), Scottish ice dancer
Lewis Gibson (footballer), English footballer

See also
Gibson Lewis, politician